Aziz Saleh al-Numan al-Khafaji  is a former Iraqi Ba'ath Party Regional Command Chairman. He was appointed Iraqi governor of Kuwait by Saddam Hussein during the 1991 Gulf War; taking over the post from Ali Hassan al-Majid in November 1990, and holding it until 27 February 1991. He previously served as Governor of Karbala (1976-1979), Governor of Najaf (1979-1980s) and Minister of Agriculture (1986-1991).

He is a member of the "dirty dozen", allegedly responsible for torture and murder in Iraq. Prior to the U.S. invasion in April 2003, Al-Numan was the Baath Party's regional command chair, responsible for West Baghdad.  He was previously the governor of Karbala and Najaf.  He was taken into custody on May 22, 2003.  At the time, he was the Number 8 on the Central Command's list of the 55 most wanted Iraqis, and was the highest-ranking person on the list of 55 to have been taken into custody to that time.  He was one of nine Iraqi leaders that the United States wished to see tried for either war crimes or crimes against humanity.

In 2011, he was transferred to Iraqi custody along with five others, tried and sentenced to death.

Nuhmah was the King of Diamonds in the most-wanted Iraqi playing cards.

References 

1940s births
Governors of Kuwait Governorate
Rulers of Kuwait
Possibly living people
Members of the Regional Command of the Arab Socialist Ba'ath Party – Iraq Region
Iraqi prisoners sentenced to death
Prisoners sentenced to death by Iraq
Prisoners and detainees of the United States military
Most-wanted Iraqi playing cards
Iraq War prisoners of war
Iraqi prisoners of war